Siddha Central Research Institute (SCRI) is a center for clinical research and methodology in Siddha medicine. This Institute is located in the campus of Arignar Anna Government Hospital of Indian Systems of medicine at Arumbakkam, Chennai, Tamil Nadu, India. It is functioning under the Central Council for Research in Siddha (CCRS).

History
In 1979, centralized projects like literary research and documentation department, mobile Clinical research unit and drug research scheme (multidisciplinary) were also established along with Pharmacognosy and Phytochemistry. From 1999 the tribal projects functioning at Thirupathur and Kalasa were merged with Central Research Institute (Siddha) along with M.C.R.U., D.R.S. (MD), DSU(S) and L.R.&D.D. also was merged with Central Research Institute (Siddha) with effect from 1.4.2007. This Institute has the basic facilities for clinical research, drug research and literary research.

Departments 
 Department of Clinical Research (DCR)
 Department of Biochemistry
 Department of Pathology
 Department of pharmacognacy
 Department of Chemistry
 Department of pharmacology
 Department of Pharmacy
 Literary Research & Documentation Department and Library (LR&DD)

Committees 
 Institutional Human Ethical Committee (IHEC)
 Institutional Animal Ethical Committee (IAEC)
 Scientific Advisory Board (SAB) of CCRS

Clinical research and hospital services 
SCRI is a presumed Siddha research institute. It is a referral hospital for Psoriasis.

Research includes:
 Clinical research 
 Drug trials are conducted.

The institute is running a general outpatient department (OPD) on all the days of the week. It has a 50 bedded research hospital for in-patients (IPD) also. This IPD is a reputed center for treatment of psoriasis and patients from all over India get admitted and treated.  The patients attending this OPD are charged nominally for their laboratory investigations. For research cases and senior citizens the investigations are done free of cost.

The government of India and the Dept of AYUSH are taking keen interest in promoting the health care of the old people through Indian systems of medicine.

Special OPDs 
1. Neerizhivu (Diabetes) Special- on every Monday

2. Geriatric Health Care- on every Tuesday

3. Reproductive and Child Health care (RCH) – on every Saturday

A special Geriatric health care unit started functioning here since 13. 05. 2008. Siddha system of medicine has a specialized branch of study called Kayakalpam (Rejuvenation therapy) for geriatric health care. A Special OPD for Neerizhivu (Diabetes mellitus) since 14.11.2014

A unit of Varmam and traditional bone setting is functioning in the OPD of this hospital and better care is given for the patients suffering from dislocations, disc prolapse, cervical spondylosis and lumbar spondylosis. The Varmam OPD functioning on every day. OPD timing is 8 AM – 12 Noon.

Department of Pharmacology 
In the Department of Pharmacology 
 Acute 
 Sub-acute 
 Chronic toxicity studies for Siddha drugs

Publications 
This institute has 230 publications in national and international peer reviewed journals.

References

External links
 SCRI website

Siddha medicine
Research institutes in Chennai
Ministry of AYUSH
1971 establishments in Tamil Nadu
Research institutes established in 1971